Eastleigh railway station serves the town of Eastleigh in the county of Hampshire in England. It is located on the South West Main Line and is the junction station for two other routes, the Eastleigh-Fareham Line and the Eastleigh-Romsey Line. South of the station are Eastleigh Railway Works and Eastleigh Depot.

History
The station was built by the LSWR and was called Bishopstoke when it was opened in 1839. The station-house was designed by Sir William Tite and has been Grade II listed since 1983.

The station has been a busy and important junction throughout its life, having gained a second branch line to Salisbury via  in 1847 and a large carriage & wagon repair shops (later to become Eastleigh Works) in 1891.  The main Waterloo to Bournemouth line was electrified in 1967, but the Romsey line closed to passenger traffic two years later in May 1969.  The Portsmouth line remained diesel worked until 1990, but was then added to the electrified network.  Passenger services over the line to Romsey restarted in 2003.

In 2015 the forecourt of the station received major improvements at a cost of £500,000

Accidents and Incidents
On 28 January 2020, a freight train derailed whilst moving at a slow speed just outside the station. It caused major structural damage to the tracks and disruption for several days across the whole South West Main Line between Southampton Central and Basingstoke. Delays lasted well into February. The derailment was caused by a defect which allowed the track to spread underneath the train.

Services
The station and its services are operated by South Western Railway. They operate services on three different lines, one is to Portsmouth Harbour via Hedge End, one is on the South West Main Line to Poole via Bournemouth. Both of these services start from London Waterloo. The third route is on the Salisbury to Romsey "Figure 6" stopping line.

Southern also operate two daily services on Mondays to Saturdays in the morning to Brighton.

Great Western Railway operate one train to Bristol Temple Meads and one to Portsmouth in the evening Monday to Friday, with the Bristol service terminating at Westbury on Saturdays.

The general off-peak service follows the pattern of:
 1 tph to Poole
 2 tph to London Waterloo
 1 tph to Salisbury
 1 tph to Portsmouth Harbour
 1 tph to Romsey

The general Sunday service is similar, but with just one train to Waterloo per hour: the Poole and Portsmouth Harbour services join/split at Eastleigh, then run to/from London Waterloo as a joint service until 4pm when the services are separated, with the Portsmouth Harbour service as a stopping service to London Waterloo.

Connections
Eastleigh station is also served by a number of bus routes, they are as follows:

 Bluestar 2 to Southampton and Fair Oak via Portswood and Bishopstoke
 Bluestar 5 to Romsey and Boyatt Wood via North Baddesley and Chandler's Ford
 UniLink U1C to National Oceanography Centre, Southampton via University of Southampton and 
 UniLink U1E to Eastleigh bus station
 UniLink U1N to Eastleigh bus station
 Xelabus X4 to Eastleigh bus station and Hedge End via Southampton Airport and West End, Hampshire

Gallery

References

External links

Local Rail Information
National Rail information for station 'Eastleigh (ESL)'

Railway stations in Hampshire
DfT Category C1 stations
Railway stations in Great Britain opened in 1839
Former London and South Western Railway stations
Railway stations served by Govia Thameslink Railway
Railway stations served by South Western Railway
Eastleigh
William Tite railway stations
Grade II listed railway stations
Railway stations served by Great Western Railway